The 1591 papal conclave (27–29 October) was held after the death of Pope Gregory XIV on 16 October that year, after less than a year as pope. This left the Holy See vacant for the third time in 14 months. The conclave lasted only three days and elected Pope Innocent IX.

Even before Pope Gregory XIV died, Spanish and anti-Spanish factions were electioneering for the next pope. Philip II of Spain's (r. 1556–1598) high-handed interference at the previous conclave was not forgotten: he had barred all but seven cardinals. This time the Spanish party in the College of Cardinals did not go so far, but they still controlled a majority, and after a quick conclave they raised Facchinetti to the papal chair as Pope Innocent IX. It took three ballots to elect him as pope. Facchinetti received 24 votes on 28 October but was not successful in that ballot to be elected as pope. He received 28 votes on 29 October in the second ballot while the third saw him prevail.

References

External links 
 https://web.archive.org/web/20110927171014/http://www.vaticanhistory.de/vh/html/innozenz_ix_.html

1591 in the Papal States
16th-century elections
1591 in politics
1591 in Europe
1591
16th-century Catholicism